WCCR may refer to:

 WCCR (AM), a radio station (1260 AM) licensed to Cleveland, Ohio, United States
 WCCR-FM, a radio station (92.7 FM) licensed to Clarion, Pennsylvania, United States
 WCCR-LP, a low-powered radio station (94.5 FM) licensed to Williamsburg, Kentucky, United States